Roger DeJordy (August 28, 1937 - April 5, 2019) was a Canadian retired professional hockey player who played for the Hershey Bears in the American Hockey League. Dejordy, whose brother Denis DeJordy was an award winning NHL goalie, was enshrined in the Hershey Bears Hockey Club Hall of Fame in 2015.

References

External links
 

1937 births
2019 deaths
Canadian ice hockey left wingers
Hershey Bears players